Platycladus is a monotypic genus of evergreen coniferous trees in the cypress family Cupressaceae, containing only one species, Platycladus orientalis, also known as Chinese thuja, Oriental arborvitae, Chinese arborvitae, biota or Oriental thuja. It is native to northeastern parts of East Asia and North Asia, but is also now naturalised as an introduced species in other regions of the Asian continent.

Description

The branches are relatively short, loosely arranged and, usually, sharply directed upwards, and the bark, brownish, is detached in narrow vertical strips. The twigs are compressed and are arranged in vertical planes. The leaves, arranged in four rows, fleshy, opposite, decussate, truncated, imbricated as adults, somewhat curved inwards, of uniform green color and with a resiniferous gland on the underside. The female cones, of pink-salmon color and later bluish-greenish when immature, centimetric and of annual maturation, are oval with 6-8 flattened, thick scales, coriaceous and provided with an apical hook.

Taxonomy

Although generally accepted as the only member of its genus, it has been suggested that the closely related species Microbiota decussata could be included in Platycladus, but this is not widely followed. Other fairly close relatives are Juniperus and Cupressus, both of these genera being graft-compatible with Platycladus. In older texts, Platycladus was often included in Thuja, which is reflected in one of its common names, "oriental thuja". But it is only distantly related to the genus Thuja. Differences include its distinct cones, wingless seeds, and its almost scentless foliage.

Etymology
The binomial Platycladus means "with broad or flattened shoots" deriving from Greek  platys "broad, flat, level"  and  klados "branch, shoot of a tree". The qualifier orientalis refers to its native habitat in China.

Distribution
It is native to northwestern China, but it is delicate to distinguish the areas where they are native safely from those where they have been introduced. It is distributed in Manchuria, Russian Far East (Amur and Khabarovsk), and now it is naturalised in Korea, Japan, India, Florida  and Iran as well. It is also cultivated in many parts of the world in parks, gardens, home yards, cemeteries and for hedges.

Uses

Resistant to drought, it is very often used as an ornamental tree, both in its homeland, where it is associated with long life and vitality, and very widely elsewhere in temperate climates. It is suitable for form cuts and year-round opaque hedges, but also forms impressive slender solitary trees. Several cultivars have been selected, of which 'Aurea Nana' has gained the Royal Horticultural Society's Award of Garden Merit. 

The wood is used in Buddhist temples both for (lavairos) construction work, and chipped, for incense burning. Its twigs and leaves contain 0.12% essential oil containing pinene and probably caryophyllene.

Gallery

References

General references
 Gymnosperm Database - Platycladus orientalis
 Arboretum de Villardebelle - Platycladus cone photos
 Conifers Around the World: Platycladus orientalis - Oriental Arborvitae .
 

Cupressaceae
Monotypic conifer genera